Kvalserien, also known as Kvalserien till SHL, was the Swedish round-robin ice hockey tournament to qualify for play in the next season of the Swedish Hockey League (SHL, previously named Elitserien), Sweden's top-level ice hockey league for men. It was replaced by a playoff round in the 2014–15 season.

Teams
Kvalserien was formed after the regular seasons of the Swedish Hockey League (SHL, previously named Elitserien) and the second-tier league HockeyAllsvenskan had been played. The two worst ranked teams in the SHL and the best four teams in HockeyAllsvenskan formed the league together with the winner of a six-round round-robin tournament between the teams ranked 4–7 from HockeyAllsvenskan. The six Kvalserien teams played each other twice, once at home ice and once on the road, giving 10 games per team and a total of 30 games. The two teams finishing first and second were promoted to the SHL the next season, while the remaining four teams played in HockeyAllsvenskan the next season.

Winners

1975 - Djurgårdens IF, Södertälje SK
1976 - IF Björklöven, Örebro IK
1977 - Djurgårdens IF, Timrå IK
1978 - Örebro IK, IF Björklöven
1979 - IF Björklöven, HV71
1980 - Skellefteå AIK, Södertälje SK
1981 - Leksands IF, Timrå IK
1982 - Hammarby IF, Djurgårdens IF
1983 - Modo AIK
1984 - Hammarby IF
1985 - HV71
1986 - Modo AIK
1987 - Modo AIK, Väsby IK
1988 - IK VIK Hockey
1989 - Västra Frölunda HC
1990 - Modo Hockey
1991 - Västra Frölunda HC
1992 - Leksands IF
1993 - IF Björklöven
1994 - AIK
1995 - Rögle BK
1996 - Brynäs IF
1997 - Södertälje SK, VIK Västerås HK
1998 - AIK, IF Björklöven
1999 - Linköpings HC, VIK Västerås HK
2000 - Timrå IK, IF Björklöven
2001 - Södertälje SK, Linköpings HC
2002 - Timrå IK, Leksands IF
2003 - Linköpings HC, Brynäs IF
2004 - MIF Redhawks, Mora IK
2005 - Leksands IF, Brynäs IF
2006 - IF Malmö Redhawks, Skellefteå AIK
2007 - Skellefteå AIK, Södertälje SK
2008 - Brynäs IF, Rögle BK
2009 - Södertälje SK, Rögle BK
2010 - Södertälje SK, AIK
2011 - Växjö Lakers, Modo Hockey
2012 - Timrå IK, Rögle BK
2013 - Örebro HK, Leksands IF
2014 - Örebro HK, Djurgårdens IF

Previous seasons

2000 season

IF Björklöven and Timrå IK returned to Elitserien after respectively one and eighteen seasons in lesser divisions. VIK Västerås HK and Linköpings HC were relegated to HockeyAllsvenskan.

2001 season

Linköpings HC and Södertälje SK returned to Elitserien after one and three seasons, respectively, in lesser divisions. Leksands IF and IF Björklöven were relegated to HockeyAllsvenskan.

2002 season

Timrå IK re-qualified for Elitserien and Leksands IF returned to Elitserien after one year in lesser divisions. AIK were relegated to HockeyAllsvenskan.

2003 season

Both Linköpings HC and Brynäs IF re-qualified for Elitserien.

2004 season

Malmö Redhawks re-qualified for Elitserien and Mora IK qualified for Elitserien for the first time in club history. Leksands IF were relegated to HockeyAllsvenskan.

2005 season

Brynäs IF re-qualified for Elitserien and Leksands IF returned to Elitserien after one year in lesser divisions. Malmö Redhawks were relegated to HockeyAllsvenskan.

2006 season

Malmö Redhawks and Skellefteå AIK respectively finished first and second and qualified for play in Elitserien in the 2006–07 season. Södertälje SK and Leksands IF were relegated from Elitserien and were forced to spend the 2006-07 season in HockeyAllsvenskan.

2007 season

Skellefteå AIK re-qualified for Elitserien and Södertälje SK returned to Elitserien after one year in lesser divisions.

2008 season

Brynäs IF remained in the highest league and Rögle BK were promoted to Elitserien at the expense of Mora IK.

2009 season

Södertälje SK and Rögle BK ended up respectively second and first and both re-qualified for Elitserien for the 2009–10 season.

2010 season

Södertälje SK finished first in Kvalserien for the second consecutive year, and AIK returned to Elitserien after eight seasons in lesser divisions.

2011 season

Växjö Lakers, HockeyAllsvenskan's regular-season winners, finished with 26 points and qualified for Elitserien for the first time in club history, at the expense of Södertälje SK. Modo Hockey re-qualified for Elitserien.

2012 season

Timrå IK defended their Elitserien spot, while Rögle BK returned to Elitserien after two years and replaced Djurgårdens IF who were relegated to the second-tier league, HockeyAllsvenskan, for the first time since the 1977–78 season. Rögle became the first HockeyAllsvenskan team in history to qualify for Elitserien by winning the playoff round to get into the Kvalserien.

2013 season

For the first time since 2006, neither of the two Elitserien teams, Timrå IK and Rögle BK, managed to defend their Elitserien/SHL spot. Instead, HockeyAllsvenskan teams Örebro HK (who qualified through a Playoff round-robin tournament) and regular-season winner Leksands IF took the two available spots for the 2013–14 SHL season. Örebro promoted to the SHL for the first time in club history, while Leksand returned to the SHL for the first time since 2005–06. Timrå were relegated to HockeyAllsvenskan for the first time since 1999–2000, while Rögle's return to Elitserien lasted for only one season.

2014 season

The 40th and final Kvalserien ended with Örebro HK defending their SHL spot and Djurgårdens IF returning to the top-tier league after a two-year stint in HockeyAllsvenskan. AIK were relegated to HockeyAllsvenskan.

References

 
Swedish Hockey League
HockeyAllsvenskan
Defunct ice hockey leagues in Sweden
Recurring sporting events established in 1975
1975 establishments in Sweden
2014 disestablishments in Sweden